Jeffrey M. Carp (July 6, 1948 – January 1, 1973) was an American blues harmonica player,  He is best known for his work with Muddy Waters, John Lee Hooker, and Howlin' Wolf. He played harmonica on numerous charting blues albums. He was also for a period of time, a side man in Earl Hooker's band.

Background
Among the artists recorded with were Muddy Waters and Howlin' Wolf. He played on albums If You Miss 'Im ... I Got 'Im by John Lee Hooker and The London Howlin' Wolf Sessions by Howlin' Wolf. A prodigy, he was said to have played beyond his years.

He was a student at the University of Chicago and played with many blues bands in the area, being exposed to the music of Muddy Waters, Howlin' Wolf and Earl Hooker. 

As a teenager, Carp had his own band, The Jeff Carp Blues Band, a group that included violinist Joel Smirnoff.

He also recorded with Muddy Waters, Earl Hooker, John Lee Hooker, The Soulful Strings, Patti Drew, and Marlena Shaw. 

He appeared on the 1969 Muddy Waters album, Fathers and Sons.

Career
He joined Sam Lay's band with guitarist Paul Asbell and the group recorded three songs for the LP Goin' To Chicago, released in 1966 on Testament Records. 

In April, 1969, he was at the recording session for Fathers and Sons by Muddy Waters. Other musicians present were Paul Butterfield, Mike Bloomfield, Paul Asbell, Otis Spann and Donald "Duck" Dunn. In May, 1969, he played on the Lightnin' album by Lightnin' Hopkins which was produced by Chris Strachwitz. Also that month, he played on Earl Hooker's Funk album. Carp also contributed vocals to the album. Carp had actually been sitting in with Hooker for while from late 1968 to early 1969. After some of Hooker's side men left, Carp and guitarist Paul Asbell were brought in as band members. Carp filled in the missing ingredient for the group that had come about due to Carey Bell's departure.

In May 1970, along with Howlin' Wolf, Hubert Sumlin and Chess Records producer Norman Dayron, Carp travelled to London for a recording session.  He was playing at London's Olympic Studio, in the recording session that took place between the 2nd and 7th of that month which would result in Howlin' Wolf's London Sessions.

Critics and producers described him in superlative terms. A reviewer of the reissued London Howlin' Wolf Sessions said "the late Jeffrey Carp provided fireballs of musical punctuation via his blistering shots on harmonica." Norman Dayron described him as "the most important talent I've worked with". Writing about a live concert by Earl Hooker in San Francisco in 1969, a reviewer said, "Mouth harpist Jeff Carp ... is magnificent - for my money better than Paul Butterfield (more musical, more inventive)". Rolling Stone wrote of Fathers and Sons "talking about harmonica playing, there’s superlative chromatic work by Jeff Carp ... he does a hell of a job".

Carp is also credited as the composer of "Bring Me Home", sung by Tracy Nelson as the title track of the 1971 Mother Earth, Bring Me Home album, on Reprise Records.

Death
Carp died by accidental drowning on January 1, 1973, while on vacation in the Caribbean with his girlfriend Scarlet Grey after jumping from a boat. He was 24.

Discography
(as a sideman)
1966 - Goin' To Chicago (Sam Lay Blues Band) 
1969 - Fathers and Sons (Muddy Waters) 
1969 - String Fever (The Soulful Strings) 
1969 - If You Miss 'Im...I Got 'Im (John Lee Hooker featuring Earl Hooker) 
1969 - Don't Have to Worry (Earl Hooker) 
1969 - Funk (Earl Hooker) 
1969 - Wild Is Love (Patti Drew) 
1969 - The Spice Of Life (Marlena Shaw) 
1970 - Tulane (Chuck Berry)
1971 - The London Howlin' Wolf Sessions (Howling Wolf)

References

Further reading
 Article mentioning Carp's mysterious death
 Review of If You Miss 'Im... I Got 'Im with reminiscences from Carp's music teacher and fellow students

 
1948 births
1973 deaths
American blues harmonica players
Deaths by drowning